The 1972–73 Essex Senior Football League season was the second in the history of Essex Senior Football League, a football competition in England.

League table

The league featured eight clubs which competed in the league last season, along with three new clubs:
Brightlingsea United, joined from the Essex and Suffolk Border League
Coggeshall Town, joined from the Essex and Suffolk Border League
Maldon Town, transferred from the Eastern Counties League

League table

References

Essex Senior Football League seasons
1972–73 in English football leagues